Sayranovo (Sayran) is a rural locality (a selo) in Novotroitsky Selsoviet, Chishminsky District, Bashkortostan, Russia. The population was 379 as of 2010. There are 7 streets.

Geography 
Sayranovo is located 30 km southeast of Chishmy (the district's administrative centre) by road. Karan-Yelga is the nearest rural locality.

References 

Rural localities in Chishminsky District